The Eleven Point River is a  river in southern Missouri and northern Arkansas, United States. It originates near Willow Springs, Missouri. The name derives from the Mississippi Valley French word pointe, which is a wooded point of land marking a river bend. Voyageurs marked distance by counting these points of land or river bends. The river flows into the Spring River southwest of Pocahontas near the small town of Black Rock.

In 1968 a  stretch was named the Eleven Point National Wild and Scenic River, one of the original eight rivers chosen to be part of the United States National Wild and Scenic Rivers System.

See also 
List of Missouri rivers
Irish Wilderness
List of Arkansas rivers

References

External links
Eleven Point River Resource Page
National Park Service
Eleven Point River Conservancy
Friends of the Eleven Point River

Rivers of Missouri
Rivers of Arkansas
Bodies of water of the Ozarks
Tributaries of the White River (Arkansas–Missouri)
Rivers of Randolph County, Arkansas
Rivers of Howell County, Missouri
Rivers of Oregon County, Missouri
Wild and Scenic Rivers of the United States